Raymond Christopher McCubbins (November 22, 1945 – August 21, 2009) was a middle-distance runner and teacher for the Winnipeg School Division from the United States. Born in Enid, Oklahoma in 1945, he won the gold medal in the men's 3000 meters steeplechase event at the 1967 Pan American Games. McCubbins later competed for Canada at the 1976 Olympics in the 10,000 meter event. McCubbins was a teacher at Kent Road School for 27 years.

McCubbins died on August 21, 2009, after a six-month battle with leukemia.

Joe Mackintosh, the brother of Chris’ first wife Marie, wrote a biography of McCubbins published by J Gordon Shillingford Publishing Inc of Winnipeg Canada in 2013 titled
‘Chris McCubbins, Running The Distance.’

References

External links

1945 births
2009 deaths
Sportspeople from Enid, Oklahoma
Track and field athletes from Oklahoma
Canadian male middle-distance runners
Canadian male long-distance runners
American male steeplechase runners
American male middle-distance runners
American male long-distance runners
Olympic track and field athletes of Canada
Athletes (track and field) at the 1976 Summer Olympics
Pan American Games gold medalists for the United States
Pan American Games medalists in athletics (track and field)
Athletes (track and field) at the 1967 Pan American Games
American emigrants to Canada
Deaths from leukemia
Deaths from cancer in Manitoba
Medalists at the 1967 Pan American Games